The 2006 Swedish Touring Car Championship season was the 11th Swedish Touring Car Championship (STCC) season. In total nine racing weekends at six different circuits were held; each round comprising one race.

Changes for 2006
 The race format and points system was changed. During the 2006 season one race of 40 minutes was held each weekend. Each race had one mandatory pitstop.
 The points system changed to the standard FIA system of 10-8-6-5-4-3-2-1.
 A privateers championship named Caran Cup was created for drivers using cars constructed in 2003 or earlier.

Teams and drivers
List of starting drivers for the 2006 Swedish Touringcar Championship season.

Race Calendar

Championship standings (after 9 of 9 rounds)

Drivers

References

Swedish Touring Car Championship seasons
Swedish Touring Car Championship
Swedish Touring Car Championship season